3rd Corps, Third Corps, III Corps, or 3rd Army Corps may refer to:

France
 3rd Army Corps (France)
 III Cavalry Corps (Grande Armée), a cavalry unit of the Imperial French Army during the Napoleonic Wars
 III Corps (Grande Armée), a unit of the Imperial French Army during the Napoleonic Wars

Germany
 III Cavalry Corps (German Empire), a unit of the Imperial German Army
 III Corps (German Empire), a unit of the Imperial German Army
 III Reserve Corps (German Empire), a unit of the Imperial German Army
 III Royal Bavarian Corps, a unit of the Bavarian Army and the Imperial German Army
 III Army Corps (Wehrmacht), a unit in World War II
 III Corps (Bundeswehr)
 III Panzer Corps (Germany)
 III (Germanic) SS Panzer Corps

Russia and Soviet Union
 3rd Army Corps (Russian Empire), a unit in World War I
 3rd Mechanized Corps (Soviet Union)
 3rd Rifle Corps, Soviet Union
 3rd Army Corps (Russia), Russian Federation

United States
 III Corps (United States)
 III Corps (Union Army)
 Third Army Corps (Spanish–American War)
 Third Corps, Army of Northern Virginia
 Third Corps, Army of Tennessee

Others
 III Corps (Australia)
 Finnish III Corps (Winter War)
 Finnish III Corps (Continuation War)
 III Army Corps (Greece)
 III Corps (India)
 3rd Army Corps (Italy)
 III Corps (North Korea)
 III Corps (Ottoman Empire)
 III Corps (South Korea)
 III Corps (South Vietnam)
 3rd Corps (Turkey)
 III Corps (United Kingdom)
 3rd Corps (Vietnam People's Army)
 3rd Army Corps (Azerbaijan)
 3rd Army Corps (Armenia)

See also
List of military corps by number
 3rd Army (disambiguation)
 3rd Battalion (disambiguation)
 3rd Brigade (disambiguation)
 3rd Division (disambiguation)
 3rd Regiment (disambiguation)
 13 Squadron (disambiguation)